Timothy John Winter, British Islamic scholar
 Tim C. Winter, Australian sociologist